, Kagawa prefectural park located in the Nagao-Myō Sanuki Kagawa Prefecture in Japan. Specified date prefectural park on June 1, 1949.

Summary 
Kikaku park is also known as a place of scenic beauty (eastern part of Kagawa). Is a park area covering 18.98ha (16.63ha city land, 2.35ha land shrine) in centered on the "Miya-ike" and "". To the west of the park is visible in figure flying crane , from the fact that "" float is seen in the pond turtle, named "".
Also extends to an area of about 33ha, including the hills and around the park. Include "Kame-Jima" rich natural forests may be other, more than of 300 species were identified, Iris Flower Field, cherry trees in the grounds.
It is one of the cherry blossoms in the region east of praise, Sakura(Somei-Yoshino) has been planted on both sides about 300 Tong crest connecting the Usa shrine Kameshima side and especially over the 300m 20m in width and length.
This area has become crowded with many blossom viewers, and the core.
Bridge "Sakura" are lit up or tie side Kame-jima the "Comprehensive Park Nagao", the season of flowers fountain is running especially.

Geography

Position 
 1673-1, Nagao-Myō, Sanuki, Kagawa, 769-2303 Japan.
Park administrators : Sanuki-City, and Kagawa Prefecture.

Transportation　 
 About 5 minutes by car from Nagao Station(Takamatsu-Kotohira Electric Railroad Nagao Line). 
 About 10 minutes by car from Zōda Station(Shikoku Railway Company Kōtoku Line . 
 About 15 minutes to about 10 km south by car from Takamatsu Expressway 13 Shido Interchange.
 Just off "Kikaku Kōen" bus stop by Sanuki-City Community bus Shido-Tawa Line(Green route).

Parking
 250 cars can be parked free of charge.
North park, central park (front of the Usa-Jinja), south side of the park is available. Moreover, it is also available parking Nagao comprehensive park. Southwest side parking park is closed when the event takes place.

References

Bibliography 

 (billboard stand in the park.)

External links

Sanuki City - Tour Guide - Kikaku prefectural park zone(In Japanese)
Sanuki City -　Tour Guide　-　Tidings of flowers(In Japanese)
Sanuki City Tourism Association -Sanuki attractions and facilities guide - Kikaku Park neighborhood(In Japanese)

Parks and gardens in Kagawa Prefecture
Places of Scenic Beauty